Hayti (pronounced "HAY-tie") is a town in and county seat of Hamlin County, South Dakota, United States. The population was 393 at the 2020 census. It is part of the Watertown, South Dakota Micropolitan Statistical Area. It is the county seat of Hamlin County.

According to tradition, the name is derived from the practice of tying bundles of hay to be burned on the prairie, hence the name Hay-tie.

History
Hayti was platted in 1907 when the South Dakota Central Railway was built through the area. The town won an election to become the county seat in 1910, taking the title from Castlewood; however, Castlewood sued to keep the county seat and won the case. In 1914, a second election gave Hayti the county seat for good.

Geography
Hayti is located at  (44.657591, -97.204391).

Hayti has been assigned the ZIP code 57241 and the FIPS place code 27820.

Demographics

2010 census
As of the census of 2010, there were 381 people, 152 households, and 102 families residing in the town. The racial makeup of the town was 96.3% White, 0.8% Native American, and 2.9% from other races. Hispanic or Latino of any race were 3.9% of the population.

There were 152 households, of which 32.2% had children under the age of 18 living with them, 53.9% were married couples living together, 8.6% had a female householder with no husband present, 4.6% had a male householder with no wife present, and 32.9% were non-families. 30.3% of all households were made up of individuals, and 15.1% had someone living alone who was 65 years of age or older. The average household size was 2.51 and the average family size was 3.20.

The median age in the town was 32.9 years. 32% of residents were under the age of 18; 5.5% were between the ages of 18 and 24; 25.2% were from 25 to 44; 22.6% were from 45 to 64; and 14.7% were 65 years of age or older. The gender makeup of the town was 49.6% male and 50.4% female.

2000 census
As of the census of 2000, there were 367 people, 157 households, and 105 families residing in the town. The population density was 1,300.6 people per square mile (506.1/km2). There were 171 housing units at an average density of 606.0 per square mile (235.8/km2). The racial makeup of the town was 98.64% White, 0.82% Native American, and 0.54% from two or more races. 43.3% were of Norwegian, 25.5% German and 13.8% Finnish ancestry according to Census 2000.

There were 157 households, out of which 31.8% had children under the age of 18 living with them, 54.8% were married couples living together, 7.0% had a female householder with no husband present, and 33.1% were non-families. 31.8% of all households were made up of individuals, and 16.6% had someone living alone who was 65 years of age or older. The average household size was 2.34 and the average family size was 2.93.

In the town, the population was spread out, with 27.8% under the age of 18, 10.4% from 18 to 24, 27.0% from 25 to 44, 16.6% from 45 to 64, and 18.3% who were 65 years of age or older. The median age was 35 years. For every 100 females, there were 106.2 males. For every 100 females age 18 and over, there were 99.2 males.

The median income for a household in the town was $39,688, and the median income for a family was $43,958. Males had a median income of $29,583 versus $19,583 for females. The per capita income for the town was $23,169. About 1.9% of families and 5.1% of the population were below the poverty line, including 7.3% of those under age 18 and 7.8% of those age 65 or over.

Notable people
 Garney Henley - Canadian Football Hall of Fame Wide receiver and defensive back, was born here.
Hope Juntunen - 2017 Goldwater Scholar part of the General Beadle Honors Program at DSU

See also
 List of towns in South Dakota

References

External links

Towns in Hamlin County, South Dakota
Towns in South Dakota
County seats in South Dakota
Watertown, South Dakota micropolitan area
Populated places established in 1907
1907 establishments in South Dakota